Martin Clayton,  is professor in ethnomusicology at Durham University. He studied at the School of Oriental and African Studies, from where he received his BA in music and Hindi in 1988 and his PhD in ethnomusicology in 1993.

Selected publications
Time in Indian Music: Rhythm, metre and form in North Indian rag performance. Oxford University Press, Oxford, 2000.
Music, time and place: Essays in comparative musicology. B.R. Rhythms, Delhi, 2007.

References

External links 

https://culturalmusicology.org/martin-clayton-the-culture-of-indian-music-performance/

Living people
Alumni of SOAS University of London
Academics of the Open University
British ethnomusicologists
Year of birth missing (living people)
Academics of Durham University